Jazz Dialogue is an album by American jazz group the Modern Jazz Quartet with a big band featuring performances recorded in 1965 and released on the Atlantic label.

Reception
The Allmusic review stated "The music, which is highlighted by new versions of such standbys as "Django," "Ralph's New Blues" and "The Golden Striker," is enjoyable enough although this LP does not live up to its potential".

Track listing
All compositions by John Lewis except as indicated
 "Home" - 2:51   
 "Django" - 6:08   
 "One Never Knows" - 4:15   
 "Animal Dance" - 3:31   
 "Intima" (Miljenko Prohaska) - 5:13   
 "The Golden Striker" - 5:36   
 "Ralph's New Blues" (Milt Jackson) - 6:28

Personnel
Milt Jackson - vibraphone
John Lewis - piano
Percy Heath - bass
Connie Kay - drums 
Bernie Glow, Ernie Royal, Clark Terry, Snooky Young - trumpet
Jimmy Cleveland, Tony Studd, Kai Winding - trombone
Charlie Mariano, Phil Woods - alto saxophone
Richie Kamuca, Seldon Powell - tenor saxophone
Wally Kane - baritone saxophone
Howard Collins - guitar
Jimmy Lewis - electric bass (track 1)

References

Atlantic Records albums
Modern Jazz Quartet albums
1965 albums
Albums produced by Nesuhi Ertegun